Tiefenbach is a municipality in the district of Landshut in Bavaria in Germany. The river Isar flows through the municipality.

References

Landshut (district)